Fijian is an Austronesian language of the Malayo-Polynesian family spoken by some 350,000–450,000 ethnic Fijians as a native language. The 2013 Constitution established Fijian as an official language of Fiji, along with English and Fiji Hindi and there is discussion about establishing it as the "national language". Fijian is a VOS language.

Standard Fijian is based on the speech of Bau, which is an East Fijian language.
A pidginized form is used by many Indo-Fijians and Chinese on the islands, while Pidgin Hindustani is used by many rural ethnic Fijians and Chinese in areas dominated by Indo-Fijians.

History

Phonology 
The consonant phonemes of Fijian are as shown in the following table:

The consonant written  has been described as a prenasalized trill  or trilled affricate .

The sounds  and  occur only in loanwords from other languages. The sounds  and  only occur for speakers from certain regions of the country.

The glottal stop  occurs in the Boumaa Fijian used to illustrate this article, but is not found in the standard language.

Note the difference in place of articulation between the voiced-voiceless fricative pairs: bilabial  vs. labiodental , and dental  vs. alveolar .

The vowel phonemes are:

In addition, there is the rising diphthong .

Syllables can consist of a consonant followed by a vowel (CV) or a single vowel (V).
Word stress is based on moras: a short vowel is one mora, diphthongs and long vowels are two morae. Primary stress is on the penultimate mora of the phonological word. That is, if the last syllable of a word is short, then the penultimate syllable will be stressed, while if the last syllable contains either a long vowel or a diphthong, then it receives primary stress. Stress is not lexical and can shift when suffixes are attached to the root.
Examples:
Stress on the penultimate syllable (final short vowel): síga, "day";
Stress on the final syllable (diphthong): cauravóu, "youth" (the stress extends over the whole diphthong).
Stress shift: cábe, "kick" → cabé-ta, "kick-TR"

Orthography 
The Fijian alphabet is based on the Latin script and consists of the following letters.
A B C D E F G H I J K L M N O P Q R S T U V W Y Z
a b c d e f g h i j k l m n o p q r s t u v w y z

Among the consonants, there is almost a one-to-one correspondence between letters and phonemes:

In the 1980s, scholars compiling a dictionary added several more consonants and a few consonant clusters to the alphabet. These newcomers were necessary to handle words entering Standard Fijian from not only English, but from other Fijian languages or dialects as well. These are the most important additions: z (nj), as in ziza 'ginger' and h (h), as in haya 'hire'.

Japanese chi kana, or in standard Brazilian Portuguese).

In addition, the digraph dr stands for retroflex , or a prenasalized trill  in careful pronunciation, or more commonly for some people and in some dialects.

The vowel letters a e i o u have roughly their IPA values, .  The vowel length contrast is not usually indicated in writing, except in dictionaries and textbooks for learners of the language, where it is indicated by a macron over the vowel in question; Dixon, in the work cited below, doubles all long vowels in his spelling system. Diphthongs are ai au ei eu oi ou and iu, pronounced .

Morpho-syntax 
Note: the examples in this section are from Boumaa dialect. It is not Standard Fijian, which is based on the Bauan dialect.

Negation 
In order to negate a phrase or clause in Fijian, certain verbs are used to create this distinction. These verbs of negation are known as semi-auxiliary verbs. Semi-auxiliary verbs fulfil the functions of main verbs (in terms of syntactic form and pattern) and have a NP or complement clause as their subject (complements clauses within negation are introduced by relators ni (which refers to an event, which is generally a non-specific unit) or me (which refers is translated as "should", referring to the event within the complement clause should occur)). Within a complement clause, the semi-auxiliary verb qualifies the predicate.

Semi-auxiliary verbs 
One semi-auxiliary verb used to express negation in Fijian is sega. This semi-auxiliary can be translated as either "there are no-" or "it is not the case that", depending on the subject it relates to. In terms of numerical expression, sega is also used to express the quantity "none". This negator can be used in almost all situations, with the exception of the imperative or in a me (classifier) clauses. When sega takes a NP as its subject, the meaning "there are no-" is assumed:

Predicate clauses can also be negated in Fijian with the semi-auxiliary verb sega. This can only be completed when the predicate is placed into a complement clause. The subject of sega must also be ni, which introduces the complement clause. It is then translated as "it is not the case that (predicate clause)". An example of this construction is shown here:

 
Hence, the only way a verb (which is generally the head of a predicate phrase) can be negated in Fijian is when it forms part of the [e sega ni VERB] construction. However, in Fijian the head of a predicate phrase may belong to almost any word class. If another word (e.g. a noun) is used, the structure of negation alters. This distinction can be shown through diverse examples of the negating NPs in Fijian. The below examples show the difference between a noun as the head of a NP and a noun as the head of a predicate in a complement clause, within negation:

NP as subject of sega

Ni as the subject of sega

Additionally, sega can also work with relator se which introduces interrogative clauses. This combination creates a form translatable as "or not": 

Another common negator is ua or waaua, which is translatable as "don't, not". Differently to sega, this semi-auxiliary verb is used for imperatives and in me clauses. Therefore, these semi-auxiliaries are fixed, and cannot be used interchangeably. Ua and waaua have the same meaning, however waaua may be more intense; in most instances either semi-auxiliary verb can be used. ua ~ waaua can take a NP as its subject, but most commonly takes the ni complement as a subject, which is demonstrated below:

An example of ua ~ waaua used in imperative structure can be seen here:

It is important to note that in the case of pronouns, they can only be negated when they form part of the NP, when acting as the predicate head. Therefore, pronouns cannot be the NP subject of semi-auxiliary verbs sega or ua ~ waaua in the way that general nouns can

Combining semi-auxiliary verbs 
Sega and ua ~ waaua can be combined with other auxiliary verbs to produce diverse constructions. Both sega and ua ~ waaua can connect with semi-auxiliary rawa ("can") to negate the concept of possibility which is attached to the verb 'can' (resulting in constructions such as "can't" and "shouldn't").

Modifiers in negation 
Two main modifiers, soti ('a lot') and sara ('very; (go) right on, immediately') play key roles in negation in Fijian, and work in conjunction with semi-auxiliary verbs. Soti is added after negators sega and ua ~ waaua, and functions as an intensity marker.  The construction sega soti is translatable as 'not a lot of, not very'. The sega soti construction requires an adjective (or an adverb which results from an adjective), and must take ni (complement clause) as its subject in order to function. Soti can be found in position immediately after sega, but may also be found after the ni relator without changing the meaning of the phrase. The primary construction is shown below:

Similarly, to soti, the modifier sara ('very; (go) right on, immediately') can also be used in conjunction with sega and ua ~ waaua. This combination is used to stress the negative sense and aspect of a phrase:

Pronouns and person markers 
The pronominal system of Fijian is remarkably rich. Like many other languages, it recognises three persons; first person (speaker),
second person (addressee), and third person (all other). There is no distinction between human, non-human, animate, or inanimate. 
Four numbers are represented; singular, dual, paucal, and plural—'paucal' refers to more than two people who have some relationship, as a family or work group; if none, 'plural' is used.  Like many other Oceanic languages, Fijian pronouns are marked for number and clusivity.

Forms and function 
Each pronoun can have five forms, but some person-number combinations may have the same form for more than one function, as can be seen in the table above.

The forms are:

Cardinal – used when a pronoun occurs as the head of a NP. A cardinal pronoun is usually preceded by the proper article o, except when preceded by a preposition:

Subject – the first constituent of a predicate, acts as person marking. Examples can be seen in examples (1) and (2) above: era and au, and (3) below: o

Object – follows the -i-final form of a transitive verb:

Possessive suffix – attaches to inalienable nouns, and

Possessive – precedes the NP head of the 'possessed' constituent in a possessive construction.

(For more information on the form and function of these possessive pronouns, see Possession.)

Use 
The major clausal structure in Fijian minimally includes a predicate, which usually has a verb at its head. The initial element in the predicate is the subject form pronoun:

This 'subject marker + verb' predicate construction is obligatory, every other constituent is optional. The subject may be expanded upon by an NP following the predicate:

The subject pronoun constituent of a predicate acts mainly as a person marker.

Fijian is a verb–object–subject language, and the subject pronoun may be translated as its equivalent in English, the subject NP of a clause in Fijian follows the verb and the object if it is included.

The social use of pronouns is largely driven by respect and hierarchy. Each of the non-singular second person pronouns can be used for a singular addressee. For example, if one's actual or potential in-laws are addressed, the 2DU pronoun should be used. Similarly, when a brother or sister of the opposite sex is addressed, the 2PA pronoun should be used, and it can also be used for same-sex siblings when the speaker wishes to show respect. The 2PL pronoun can be used to show respect to elders, particularly the village chief.

Possession 
Possession is a grammatical term for a special relationship between two entities: a "possessor" and a "possessed". The relationship may be one of legal ownership, but in Fijian, like many other Austronesian languages, it is often much broader, encompassing kin relations, body parts, parts of an inanimate whole and personal qualities and concepts such as control, association and belonging.

Fijian has a complex system of possessive constructions, depending on the nature of the possessor and of the possessed. Choosing the appropriate structure depends on knowing whether the possessor is a personal or place name, a pronoun, or a common noun (with human or non-human, animate or inanimate reference), and also on whether the possessed is a free or bound noun.

Possessor 
Only an animate noun may be a possessor in the true possessive constructions shown below, with possession marked on the possessed NP in a number of ways. For personal and place name possessors, the possessive construction may be made by affixing the possessive suffix –i to the possessed noun, bound or free. If the possessor is a pronoun, the possessed noun must be marked by one of the pronominal markers which specify person, number and inclusivity/exclusivity (see table). If the possessor is inanimate, the possessive particle ni is usually placed between the possessed NP and the possessor NP. The particle ni then indicates association, rather than formal possession, but the construction is still regarded as a possessive construction.

Possessed 
Free nouns can stand alone and need no affix; most nouns in Fijian fall into this class. Bound nouns require a suffix to complete them and are written ending in a hyphen to indicate this requirement. Tama- (father) and tina- (mother) are examples of bound nouns. The classes of free and bound nouns roughly correspond with the concept, common in Austronesian languages, of alienable and inalienable possession, respectively. Alienable possession denotes a relationship in which the thing possessed is not culturally considered an inherent part of the possessor, and inalienable possession indicates a relationship in which the possessed is regarded as an intrinsic part of the possessor.

Body parts and kin relations are typical examples of inalienable possession. Inanimate objects are typical examples of alienable possession.

The alienable nature of free nouns is further marked by prefixes, known as classifiers, indicating certain other characteristics. Some common examples are me- when the possessed noun is something drinkable, ke- (or e) when the noun is something edible and we- when the referent of the possessed noun is personal property.

Possessive constructions 
The word order of a possessive construction for all except inanimate possessors is possessed NP-classifier(CLF) + possessive marker (POSS) + possessor NP.

For an inanimate possessor, the word order is possessed NP + ni + possessor NP.

Note that there is some degree of flexibility in the use of possessive constructions as described in this table.

Examples

Syntax 
The normal Fijian word order is VOS (verb–object–subject):

Sample phrases

Greetings 
Below are some examples of Fijian greetings.

Sample text 
Era sucu ena galala na tamata yadua, era tautauvata ena nodra dokai kei na nodra dodonu. E tiko na nodra vakasama kei na nodra lewaeloma, sa dodonu mera veidokadokai ena yalo ni veitacini.

(All human beings are born free and equal in dignity and rights. They are endowed with reason and conscience and should act towards one another in a spirit of brotherhood.)

Universal Declaration of Human Rights, Article 1

Grammatical abbreviations 

MODIF:modifier

National language debate 

In May and June 2005, a number of prominent Fiji Islanders called for the status of Fijian to be upgraded. It was not an official language before the adoption of the 1997 Constitution, which made it co-official with English and Fiji Hindi. It is still not a compulsory subject in schools, but Education Minister, Ro Teimumu Kepa, has endorsed calls for that to change, as has Great Council of Chiefs Chairman Ratu Ovini Bokini. Similar calls came from Misiwini Qereqeretabua, the Director of the Institute of Fijian Language and Culture, and from Apolonia Tamata, a linguistics lecturer at Suva's University of the South Pacific, both of whom said that recognition of the Fijian language is essential to the nation's basic identity and as a unifying factor in Fiji's multicultural society.

The Fiji Labour Party leader Mahendra Chaudhry also endorsed the call for Fijian to be made a national language and a compulsory school subject if the same status was given to Fiji Hindi, a position that was echoed by Krishna Vilas of the National Reconciliation Committee.

See also 
 East Fijian languages
 Languages of Fiji
 West Fijian languages

Notes

Sources 
 
 Dryer, Matthew S. & Haspelmath, Martin (eds.) 2013. The World Atlas of Language Structures Online. Leipzig: Max Planck Institute for Evolutionary Anthropology. (Available online at http://wals.info, Accessed on 2015-05-04.)

External links 

 Fijian language, alphabet and pronunciation at Omniglot
  Fijian–English / English–Fijian Dictionary
 Na Soqoni Tabu: Na Veitarataravi Ni Noda Veiqaravi Kei Na Kalou Anglican Holy Communion in Fijian
 A collection of open access Fijian recordings in Kaipuleohone. 
 Index cards of plant and animal names, labeled 'Fiji [plants]' archived with Kaipuleohone 
 Materials on Fijian are included in the open access Arthur Capell collections (AC1 and AC2) held by Paradisec. 
 Paradisec also holds an open access collection of Fijian music Fijian manuscripts in the Pacific Manuscripts Bureau collection,  
 George Grace's manuscript collection at the University of Hawai'i includes Fijian

 
East Fijian languages
Languages of Fiji
Verb–object–subject languages